Henry Bernard Carpenter (April 22, 1840 – July 17, 1890), was an Irish Unitarian clergyman, orator, author, and poet.  Educated at Oxford University, his written works were principally in verse, three of which were published, The Oatmeal Crusaders, or A Nine Days' Wander Round, Up and Down Mount Washington, Being a Serio-comic Poem (1875), Liber amoris, Being the Book of Love of Brother Aurelius (1886), and A Poet's Last Songs (1891) published posthumously.

Personal
Carpenter was a son of the Reverend Henry Carpenter, perpetual curate of St. Michael's, Liverpool at his death in 1864, and brother of William Boyd Carpenter, the Anglican Bishop of Ripon.  He married Emma Bailey in 1878, and had a son named Henry in 1882.

Death 
Carpenter died on July 17, 1890 at the age of 50, he was survived by his wife and his 8 year old son. Carpenter received tributes from many, including poet and journalist John Boyle O'Reilly (who died less than a month after Carpenter). He was buried in North Bridgton Cemetery.

References

External links
 

1840 births
1890 deaths
Irish emigrants to the United States (before 1923)